Ali Khanabad (also Romanized as ʿAlī Khānābād) is a village in Howmeh Rural District, in the Central District of Gilan-e Gharb County, Kermanshah Province, Iran. At the 2006 census, its population was 244, in 54 families.

References 

Populated places in Gilan-e Gharb County